The Table tennis competition at the 2010 Central American and Caribbean Games was held in Mayagüez, Puerto Rico. The tournament was scheduled to be held from 22 to 30 July.

Medal summary

Men's events

Women's events

Mixed events

References

External links

Events at the 2010 Central American and Caribbean Games
2010 in table tennis
2010